California's 39th State Senate district is one of 40 California State Senate districts. It is currently represented by Democrat Toni Atkins of San Diego.

District profile 
The district encompasses most of the city of San Diego, along with some of its inner suburbs. It is centered on Downtown San Diego and mainly stretches along the city's coastline, including part of San Diego Bay.

San Diego County – 30.0%
 Coronado
 Del Mar
 San Diego – 68.0%
 Solana Beach

Election results from statewide races

List of senators 
Due to redistricting, the 39th district has been moved around different parts of the state. The current iteration resulted from the 2011 redistricting by the California Citizens Redistricting Commission.

Election results 1992 - present

2020

2016

2012

2008

2004

2000

1996

1992

See also 
 California State Senate
 California State Senate districts
 Districts in California

References

External links 
 District map from the California Citizens Redistricting Commission

39
Government of San Diego County, California
California State Senate 39
Coronado, California
Del Mar, California
La Jolla, San Diego
Ocean Beach, San Diego
Rancho Santa Fe, California
Solana Beach, California